Deutschland sucht den Superstar (DSDS; "Germany is looking for the Superstar") is a German reality talent show. Part of the Idol franchise, it was created by British media mogul Simon Fuller as a spin-off from the British show Pop Idol, of which two series were broadcast between the years of 2001 and 2003. Debuting to mediocre ratings in November 2002 on the RTL network, the show has since become one of the most successful shows on German television.

The program aims to discover the best singer in the country through a series of nationwide auditions in which viewer voting determines the winner. Voting is done through phone and SMS text voting.

In July 2022, RTL announced that the show would discontinue after the conclusion of the 20th season in 2023.

Season summaries

Season 1

The first season 2002–2003 of Deutschland sucht den Superstar debuted without much hype in November 2002 on the RTL network. The show's co-hosts were Swiss actress Michelle Hunziker and former soap opera actor Carsten Spengemann, while the jury consisted of music producer Dieter Bohlen, radio host Thomas Bug, British music journalist Shona Fraser, and then-president of BMG Germany, Thomas M. Stein. Through word of mouth generated by the appeal of its contestants and the presence of Bohlen's acid-tongued commentary, the show grew into a phenomenon ending with a finale viewed by an estimated twelve million viewers in March 2003.

 Winner Alexander Klaws signed a recording contract with BMG, the label in partnership with DSDS. Immediately post-finale, Klaws released three singles, most notably the coronation song "Take Me Tonight" which was written by Bohlen and debuted on top of the German Singles Chart, eventually becoming the second biggest-selling single of 2003 – only losing to "We Have a Dream", the pre-released recording of all ten finalists. Klaws has subsequently had three albums and several hit singles mostly from his more successful first album. While his debut, Take Your Chance (2003), and its follow-up, Here I Am (2004), saw nationwide success and garnered him several ECHO Award nominations, his independent 2006 release, Attention! failed to link on previous sales figures. He has since established a secondary career as an actor on the Sat.1 telenovela Anna und die Liebe and appeared in leading roles on musicals such as Dance of the Vampires and Tarzan.

Besides Klaws, all ten finalists with the exception of then-pregnant Andrea Josten signed record deals with various record companies. Runner-up Juliette Schoppmann also signed with BMG, but in contrast to public expectations she declined working with Bohlen. Instead, she released three singles of which two entered the top ten and a solo album, Unique, which eventually debuted in 2004. Due to moderate sales BMG dropped her shortly after its release. She has since made herself a name as professional songwriter. Third-placed Daniel Küblböck also expanded his nationwide but extremely polarising popularity with a contract with BMG. Until June 2004 he released four major succeeded hit singles and a number-one album, titled Positive Energien (2003). However, further efforts failed on the charts after a controversial participations in the German versions of I'm a Celebrity, Get Me Out of Here! and Big Brother and the release of his flopped motion picture Daniel – Der Zauberer (2004).

Vanessa Struhler became the protégé of hip hop producer DJ Tomekk and saw solid commercial success with her first album, Ride with Me (2003). Gracia Baur also was signed to BMG, but was dropped after her moderate succeeded rock debut Intoxicated (2003). She then signed with Bros Music and was selected to represent Germany in the Eurovision Song Contest 2005 with the song "Run & Hide", where it placed last in a field of 24. Judith Lefeber, Daniel Lopes, and Nektarios Bamiatzis also scored mediocre to little success after the show with their own releases.

Season 2

In the second series of DSDS 2003–2004, co-hosts Hunziker and Spengemann and all four jury members reprised their engagements in the show. Following the success of the first installment, the second season was aired to a higher profile during 2003 fall schedule, including an increased number of episodes, budgets and charges for commercial spots. In contrast to the first season, however, the second soon found its main audience but never reached the overwhelming hype and demand which the first season had captured. This fact was underscored by decreasing phone votes and ratings, which were released after the show's final.

 This time, teacher Elli Erl emerged as the winner. Though Erl agreed to release the Bohlen-produced coronation song "This Is My Life" in a remixed edition, she declined collaborating with him on her debut album In My Dreams due to musical differences. While the debut single still reached the top three of the German Singles Chart, the album, released in October 2004, reached number thirty-three on the German Albums Chart and spawned another two singles of which none became a commercial hit, making Erl the lowest-selling DSDS winner to date. Her following two albums Moving Out (2007) and Human (2009) failed to chart anywhere.

Unlike in season one, the other finalists hit on major problems when they watched out for record deals. While runner-up Denise Tillmanns never signed a recording contract, third-place finisher Philippe Bühler established himself as a professional songwriter and released two R&B-influenced singles, entitled "Warum?" (2005) and "Ich kann dich lieben" (2006), both of which entered the top forty of the German Singles Chart. Anke Wagner signed with independent label Perleberg, but neither her debut single nor her album magaged to enter any chart. Benjamin Martell was signed to BMG, but was dropped when he demanded to write the album by himself. Fifth-place finisher Gunther Göbbel became part of the R&B duo Lemon Ice, whose cover single "Stand by Me" entered the German top twenty in fall 2006. Lorenzo Woodard participated in several prominent reality shows such as Die Alm and Ich bin ein Star – Holt mich hier raus! and has since enjoyed media attention under his transsexual identity "Lorielle London".

Season 3

 After an absence of one year (2004–2005), the third season 2005–2006 introduced several new elements. Neither Hunziker nor Spengemann were asked back as the show's hosts as the studio wanted a new complexion on the season. They were replaced with Marco Schreyl and Dutch co-host Tooske Ragas. The jury cast also went through radical changes; Dieter Bohlen remained the only original member, and was eventually joined by music producer Sylvia Kollek and former manager Heinz Henn.

Season 4

The fourth season of Deutschland sucht den Superstar was aired on German channel RTL from January to May 2007. Mark Medlock, this season's winner, was awarded a contract with Sony BMG. The judges in this season were Dieter Bohlen, Heinz Henn and Anja Lukaseder. It was hosted by Marco Schreyl and Tooske Ragas. The viewers chose the contestant's fates as they were able to call for their favorite contestant. The voting results were published on May 7, 2007.

Season 5

 Because of the success of season four RTL decided to create a fifth season in 2008. This was announced just before the fourth season final show was shown on TV. There were several changes: Marco Schreyl became the sole host of the show, without the assistance of Tooske Ragas. Due to some arguments with Dieter Bohlen, Heinz Henn was replaced in the jury by Andreas "Bär" Läsker. Läsker discovered and is the manager of Die Fantastischen Vier (The Fantastic Four), and joined existing jury members Bohlen and Anja Lukaseder. The last substantial change concerns only one semi-final shows ("Top 15 shows") with the name Jetzt oder nie (Now or Never): So far the 10 best candidates had been determined by telephone and SMS voting. Instead the jury selected the Top 10 live in front of 1,000 spectators. The five contestants with the highest number of votes from the public went through to the motto shows. The judges picked five more contestants of the remaining 10 to join them. Later, the candidates enter the final shows with public voting as in the earlier series. With the new rules, the producers hope to increase the excitement and to prevent good candidates from being knocked out too early. The auditions started in August on Mallorca and for the first time ever on Ibiza. From September on the casting crew toured throughout Germany. The first show, Now or never – Jetzt oder nie, aired on March 8, 2008.

Season 6

The sixth season of Deutschland sucht den Superstar was aired on German channel RTL from January to May 2009. The season's winner, Daniel Schuhmacher, was awarded a contract with Sony BMG. The judges in this season were Dieter Bohlen, Nina Eichinger, and Volker Neumüller. It was hosted by Marco Schreyl. The viewers chose the contestant's fates as they were able to call for their favorite contestant. As with season 5, the "Top 10" was created by the Top 5 contestants with the most telephone and SMS voting and the other five were selected by the jury.

Season 7

The seventh season of Deutschland sucht den Superstar was aired on German channel RTL from 6 January to 17 April 2010. The season marked a new national record with more than 35,000 participants. The season's winner was Mehrzad Marashi.

Public votes
Mehrzad Marahsi won the show. Second was Menowin Fröhlich and on third place Manuel Hoffmann. Menowin has won every liveshow but lost against Mehrzad who won the final with 56,04%. Manuel Hoffmann was eliminated in the 5th show, but he came back after Helmut Orosz was expelled from the show. Manuel came back and reached the semi-final, so that he was the first one who was eliminated and has survived more than one show again. Thomas Karaoglan, who reached the 5th place was known as der Checker and Kim Debkowski has made some advertisement during her video previous her performance with some beauty tips on Kim Gloss Tv.

The live-shows began with the Top-15 show to determine the contestants that would make up the Top 10 in the mottoshows. As done in the previous seasons, the Top 10 were contestants put through from the public vote and the jury's vote. However, 7 (instead of 5) contestants were put through with the public votes and 3 (instead of 5) would be put through by the jury; which ultimately became the contestants that ranked with the next three largest number of votes. In the first live show, Steffi Landerer, who was known for her sex appeal, was eliminated. Marcel Pluschke, who was eliminated on the second live-show, did not perceive an excellent audience respect because of his weak voice and country music roots (which was a first in DSDS). Though criticized for his song selection in the third live show, Nelson Sangaré was surprisingly eliminated after ranking as one of the top contestants throughout the first and second live-shows. After being in the bottom groups every week, Ines Redjeb was eventually eliminated in the fourth live-show. Though proving to be a favorite in the competition despite ranking in the bottom half of the voting, Manuel Hoffmann was eliminated in the fifth show against Helmut Orosz. Orosz, who was a Top 50 contestant in the second season, became criticized for his problems with singing correct texts; immediately after Hoffmann's elimination, the producers of DSDS had found a video of Orosz with a friend using cocaine recently, to which Orosz confessed. Because of this, Orosz was disqualified from the contest and Hoffmann returned to the live-shows surpassing crowd favorite Thomas Karaoglan in the sixth-live show and Kim Debkowski in the seventh live-show. However, Hoffmann's journey ended in the semi-final leaving the finale in the hands of the season's front-runners Menowin Fröhlich and Mehrzad Marashi. Fröhlich, a local DJ, successfully auditioned for the show in the third season making it to the Top-20 live-shows; he later became disqualified due to battery and fraud. Both friends throughout the recall, tensions rose throughout the competition between fans and themselves. After the final vote, Marashi won though only ranking in first place in the Top-15 and the finale as Fröhlich ranked first every week.

Season 8

Deutschland sucht den Superstar Season 8 is the eighth season of the Idol series in Germany began airing on RTL on 8 January 2011. The winner will get a recording contract with Universal Music Group. 34,956 people auditioned throughout the 35 cities that hosted auditions. Nina Eichinger and Volker Neumüller were removed from the panel. Their successors are Swiss singer Patrick Nuo and singer/dancer Fernanda Brandão. Marco Schreyl returned as the host. DSDS has extended participation privileges to Austria and Switzerland. The Top 35 will be going to the Maldives. The final aired on 7 May 2011, and the winner was Pietro Lombardi. This season reintroduced the contestants singing with backing tracks as opposed to a live band.

Controversies
The Hamburger Morgenpost questioned whether RTL misquoted DSDS Top 10 candidate Anna-Carina Woitschack. In an interview, Anna-Carina was quoted as saying "It was cut together all wrong. I never said that I hate Sarah – but on the contrary, I do not hate Sarah Engels. That is what I said. But it was cut this way by RTL, because it looks good for the show."

RTL received a statement from the Office of Public Safety stating that Sebastian Wurth was not allowed to participate after 10 PM. RTL was also fined 15,000 Euro for the incident.

The Hamburger Morgenpost questioned whether the liveshows were actually live broadcast. In the 3rd Mottoshow, Marco Angelini slipped up in his performance and forgot to sing at the correct time.

Pietro Lombardi's brother posted nude picture of Sarah Engels after she used Pietro's cell phone to talk to girls. The hardcore fans of Pietro Lombardi told his brother Marco about this and he wasn't happy about this. So, he decided to take "revenge." Pietro's brother also wrote "Everyone knows how cheap Sarah Engels is. She is sneaky. A liar."

DSDS host Marco Schreyl mixed up the phone numbers for candidates Zazou Mall and Marco Angelini. A camera shot of Marco Angelini showed him enraged towards the lens. A reporter for the Hamburger Morgenpost, who was present, reported there were chaotic scenes shortly before the end of the recording. Dieter Bohlen mentioned the mistake and Marco Schreyl replied that "It could be made easier for the host". RTL decided that no candidate would be eliminated and the final show was pushed back a week.

On the 6th mottoshow, Sarah Engels had two wardrobe incidents, when dancing to "Walking on Sunshine", where she began dancing too close to one of the cameras, causing two upskirts. This was eventually shown to the studio audience during the recap of her performance and was noted by the judges.

Season 9

For the ninth season of Deutschland sucht den Superstar, jury members Fernanda Brandão and Patrick Nuo were replaced by Bruce Darnell and Cascada's Natalie Horler. The winner will receive a recording contract with Universal Music Group and €500,000. Participants must be between the ages of 16 and 30 and living in Germany, Austria or Switzerland. The auditions stage had 34 audition events in 33 cities across Germany, Austria and Switzerland. 35.401 participants auditioned for season 9. RTL decided to have a "Top 16" instead of a "Top 15". Unlike previous seasons, participants sung in a duet. Luca Hänni won season 9. At age 17, Luca is the youngest winner-to-date.

The Cologne district government wants to enforce a law that protect minors. The law will not allow minors to participate on stage after 10 PM. The issue started last season when this law was enforced for Sebastian Wurth. RTL received a 15,000 Euro fine for the incident. The candidates that this would affect are Daniele Negroni, age 16; Luca Hänni, age 17; Vanessa Krasniqi, age 17 and Fabienne Rothe, age 16. RTL decided to cancel the results show for 7, 14 and 21 April due to the minor protection law.

Hamburger Morgenpost hinted that Thomas Pegram's elimination was expected because of some of his statistics on Facebook. He has the fewest people who clicked the "like" button only 4.105 people and received only 813 comments after the official DSDS Facebook fanpage put up his photo. Hamburger Morgenpost continued this when Silvia Amaru was eliminated restating how the lowest "like" total showed who was going to be eliminated before the final decision. Silvia Amaru's photo had 4.761 "like" while the competition was at around 10.000 on Sunday 11 March at 10:15 CET. Hamburger Morgenpost stated that it should be "clear" for RTL that "Facebook is a power killer" for Deutschland sucht den Superstar. In the Top 8, Kristof had the fews likes for his photo and was not voted out of the show.

Kristof Hering suffered verbal and death threats during his participation during season 9 due to his homosexuality. People were writing stuff like "You are sooo gay to .."; "I'll cut your eggs"; "Get out of DSDS, if you value your life" and "I stab you up". RTL filed charges against unknown persons because of the threats.

TV ratings for season 9 have been disappointing. None of the mottoshows have reached 5 million viewers. season 1 averaged 8.09 million viewers and season 8 averaged 6.32 million viewers in the show's key demographic (ages 14 to 49). Only 4.71 million people watch the final show of season 9. This is the lowest viewership in the history of all the final shows of DSDS. RTL stated they want to continue with the show declining rates.

Season 10 

On 30 April 2012, RTL announced that the show will return for a tenth season, in spite of declining ratings in Season 9. It was also announced that previous judges Natalie Horler and Bruce Darnell as well as host Marco Schreyl will be replaced. Furthermore, a "female quota" will be introduced in order to have an equal balance of male and female contestants.

According to reports, the show was supposed to have a live band accompanying the contestants in the live shows, which has been absent since season 8. However, the first motto show of the season did not feature a live band and contestants sounded to be singing to pre-recorded tracks.

On 14 September 2012, RTL announced Tom and Bill Kaulitz from the MTV Video Music Awards winning band Tokio Hotel and Mateo Jaschik founding member of the German dancehall band Culcha Candela as the replacements for Natalie Horler and Bruce Darnell in the jury. This is the first time since season 2 that the jury consisted of four judges.

The first episode attracted 5.18 Mio. viewers, which marks the lowest season premiere rating since season 1, which has not been broadcast on the primetime slot on 8.15pm. Despite this, the show was renewed for an eleventh season for 2014. Only 4,63 Mio. viewers watched the final, a major low record.

The winner of the tenth season was Beatrice Egli. She became the first female winner since season 2 and the first German Schlager singer to win the competition. The season featured a female finale which has happened only twice so far in the history of the show. Furthermore, this is the first time that three women reached the final four.

Season 11 

On 13 March 2013 RTL announced, that there will be an eleventh season. The judges from the previous season, with the exception of Dieter Bohlen, were replaced by rapper Kay One, the singer Mieze Katz of the band MIA., and the Schlager singer Marianne Rosenberg. Nazan Eckes returned as the host of the eleventh season, however without Raúl Richter. The season started on Wednesday, 8 January 2014 on RTL.

The top 30, which consisted of 15 female and 15 male contestants, were brought to Cuba for the further competition. In the top 20 round, the judges chose the top ten to compete in the live shows. Five of the ten eliminated contestants were given a wild card by the judges and made available for public voting. The two with the highest votes by the viewers will be joining the top 10.

The season premiere attracted 2,70 Mil. viewers, which makes it the least-watched season premiere in the history of Deutschland such den Superstar. However, ratings improved up to 3,33 Mil. viewers by episode three, which makes it the most watched episode of the season so far within the demographics between ages 14–49. Overall, this season showed the lowest ratings in the history of the show.

For the second year in a row this season featured a female final top two and producing a female Superstar for the third time in the history of the show. Aneta Sablik was announced as the winner on 3 May 2014.

Season 12 

During the live-shows of season 11, it was announced that the castings for season 12 will start in August 2014. RTL's Head of Programm Frank Hoffmann stated in April 2014 that he wants to keep the series for the years the come, although the ratings continued to fall, especially in the live shows. He further explained that the live-shows will be cut to an "absolut minimum". In Fall 2014, RTL gave closer details to the changes of Season 12. The liveshows are replaced with pre-recorded concerts in clubs in Germany, Austria and Switzerland. Only the announcement of the results will be broadcast live. In contrary to the seasons before the final will not take place in a TV studio in Cologne, but in the ÖVB Arena in Bremen.

For the first time, auditions will be held in the Czech Republic, Poland, the Netherlands, Luxembourg and Belgium.

In October 2014, RTL announced that Marianne Rosenberg, Mietze Katz and Kay One won't return for the twelfth season. The new jury consists of Dieter Bohlen, Swiss discjockey DJ Antoine, Schlager singer Heino and singer Mandy Capristo.

The winner of the Deutschland sucht den Superstar 2015 was announced as Severino Seeger with Viviana Grisafi finishing as the runner-up. The winner song entitled Hero of My Heart was produced and written by juror Dieter Bohlen.

Season 13

In the first event show of the twelfth season, Oliver Geissen announced that 2016 should be a season for which you should be able to apply for now. [35] In the final betrayed Dieter Bohlen that for this season all previous limits such as the age restriction are repealed. Accordingly, the motto of the squadron "No Limits" is. In June 2015, RTL announced that Oliver Geissen will host the Final Shows in 2016 again. On October 1, 2015 RTL announced that next Dieter Bohlen also H.P. Baxxter, Vanessa Mai and Michelle are on the jury. During the auditions, each judge has the option to send a Golden CD a candidate directly in the foreign-Recall. was implemented along the Golden Turd, with the judges can distinguish particularly poor performances. The foreign-Recall took place on Jamaica.

Prince Damien Ritzinger was the winner of the Deutschland sucht den Superstar 2016 with Laura van den Elzen finishing as the runner-up. The winner song is entitled "Glücksmoment".

Season 14

During the live-shows of season 13, it was announced that the castings for season 14 will start in August 2016. In Fall 2016, RTL gave closer details to the changes of Season 14. This season's the foreign-Recall was in Dubai and the contestants were performing in the desert, on the helipad of the Burj Al Arab, in front of the world's tallest free-standing-structure, the Burj Khalifa. The pre-recorded concerts in clubs in Germany were replaced by the mottoshows (theme shows) which were used from season 1 to 10.

In 2016, RTL announced that H.P. Baxxter, Michelle and Dieter Bohlen would return, while Vanessa Mai was replaced by YouTuber Shirin David. Oliver Geissen returned as the host of the live shows. This season marked an all-time high because there was a final 14 which was the highest amount of mottoshow contestants ever. Also for the first time, a wild card voting was introduced where the public voted Alphonso Williams who was eliminated just before the mottoshows back in the competition. Alphonso Williams was announced the winner on 6 May followed by Alexander Jahnke, Maria Voskania and Duygu Goenel. With 54 years Williams is the oldest winner to date.

Season 15

For Season 15, Dieter Bohlen announced a new jury that consists of Carolin Niemczyk, Ella Endlich and Mousse T. The winner was the 16 years old Marie Wegener. She is the youngest winner ever and only the fourth woman to win the show and the first to win against a male in the top two. Michel Truog was the Runner-Up and Michael Rauscher reached the third Place.

Season 16

For Season 16, RTL and Dieter Bohlen engaged German soul singer Xavier Naidoo, Season 8's winner Pietro Lombardi and professional dancer Oana Nechiti to be a judges on Deutschland sucht den Superstar. 20 year old Davin Herbrüggen was the winner, where Nick Feretti and Joana Kesenci came in second and third pace.

Season 17

For the start of Season 17, the judges stayed as they are. The season premiered on 4 January 2020. Xavier Naidoo was subsequently excluded from the jury and replaced by Florian Silbereisen.
The winner was Ramon Roselly, Chiara Dꞌamico reached 2nd, Joshua Tappe 3rd and Paulina Wagner the 4th place. For the second time the winner was a singer of german Schlager and the first male to do so. He reached the highest percentage of voting in the show's history.

Season 18

The eighteenth season will begin airing on 2021. On 13 August 2020, it was announced that next to the judge Dieter Bohlen will seat Mike Singer and Michael Wendler. On 16 August 2020, it was announced Maite Kelly as the fourth judge. Due to his public belief in conspiracy theories and other statements, Michael Wendler was completely cut out of the show. The season will be the last season with Dieter Bohlen as a judge. Thomas Gottschalk replaced Bohlen in the live shows since he was unable to participate because of an illness. For the first time there were only two live shows and also it was the first Top four to just consist of male contestants. Jan-Marten Block was the winner of the season and Karl Jeroboan came in the second place.

Season 19

The 19th season started on January 22, 2022 and was won by Harry Marcello Laffontien while his younger brother Gianni Laffontien finished fourth. This was the first time in the show that two brothers reached a seasons final. The Jury consists of Florian Silbereisen, Toby Gad and Ilse Delange.

Criticisms and controversies
The German Cultural Council accused RTL "malicious disregard" for humanity after a 17-year-old had a nervous breakdown during his audition. The Kommission für Jugendmedienschutz opened a review procedure against Deutschland sucht den Superstar and KJM boss Wolf-Dieter Ring stated that "the manner in which contestants are humiliated on the show could have detrimental effects on young viewers."

Elli Erl, the winner of season 2, confirmed that RTL asked for fake stories when she participated in the show. Again, in season 8, RTL created fake stories. RTL misquoted DSDS season 8 candidate Anna-Carina Woitschack. In an interview, Anna-Carina was quoted as saying "It was cut together all wrong. I never said that I hate Sarah – but on the contrary, I do not hate Sarah Engels. That is what I said. But it was cut this way by RTL, because it looks good for the show."

DSDS Kids
On 13 March 2012, RTL announced that there will be a kids edition of DSDS. The ages will be from 4 to 14. The participants will get training scholarship and prize money. Dieter Bohlen, Michelle Hunziker and Dana Schweiger were named to the jury for season 1. There were 38.664 applications for season 1 of the show.

German child protection association president Heinz Hilgers advised parents not to apply for the show. He claimed that the adult version "was based on humiliation and embarrassment". The association's director, Paula Honkanen-Schoberth, stated that "Casting shows are geared towards making one person successful" and also claimed "The message for the rest is, 'you're no good.'" However, RTL stated that this is a family show and it wants to encourage the children.

Season details

Formats

Judges and hosts

Judges

DSDS

Annotations
 1 Max von Thun was replaced by Volker Neumüller during the auditions of season 6.
 2 Sylvie Meis stepped in for Nina Eichinger in the final of season 7.
 3 Andrea Berg was a guest judge on the seventh "Mottoshow" of season 10.
 4 Florian Silbereisen replaced Xavier Naidoo from the second "Liveshow" until the final of season 17.
 5 After the filming the auditions of the 18th season, Michael Wendler decided to leave the jury.
 6 Thomas Gottschalk replaced Dieter Bohlen in the "Liveshows" of season 18.
 7 There were different guest judges on the season 19 "Liveshows": Thomas Anders on the first show, Sarah Engels on the second show, and Joachim Llambi in the semi-final and final.

DSDS Kids

Presenters

DSDS

Annotations
 1 Yvonne Catterfeld stepped in for Michelle Hunziker in the third "Top-50-Show" of season 2.
 2 Daniel Hartwich stepped in for Nazan Eckes in the semi-final of season 11.

DSDS Kids

References

External links 
DSDS official website
DSDS video clips
DSDS Portal
DSDS Superstar
DSDS Finale
DSDS page on Facebook
 

 
2010s German television series
2020s German television series
RTL (German TV channel) original programming
Television series by Fremantle (company)
German television series based on British television series